The 2002 USA Outdoor Track and Field Championships was organised by USA Track & Field and held from June 21 to 23 at the Cobb Track & Angell Field in Palo Alto, California. The three-day competition served as the national championships in track and field for the United States. The same facility would host this meet the following year, but this was the last year to use the three day format as the four-day format was adopted in 2003. The combined track and field events were contested at Edwards Stadium in Berkeley, California in the two days preceding the start of the main programme.

Marion Jones won a women's 100 m/200 m sprint double – the third time in her career that she had done so, and her fifth straight 200 m win. Four had their fourth consecutive title at the event: Regina Jacobs in the 1500 m, Gail Devers in the 100 m hurdles, Sandra Glover in the 400 m hurdles, and Stacy Dragila in the pole vault. On the men's side Allen Johnson had his third straight and fifth career 110 m hurdles win. In the throws both Breaux Greer (javelin) and Adam Setliff (discus) took their third consecutive titles, while Lance Deal won his ninth career (and final) hammer throw championship.

The sprinting events were affected by retrospective doping disqualifications: the original men's 200 m and 400 m winners Ramon Clay and Alvin Harrison were stripped of their national titles. Darvis Patton and Angelo Taylor were raised to the status of national champion as a result. Men's 100 m runner-up Tim Montgomery was also disqualified, as was women's 100 m third-placer Kelli White.

The competition was used to select the national teams to be sent to the 2002 IAAF World Cup and also the 2002 IAAF World Race Walking Cup. Four American national champions went on to win at that year's IAAF World Cup competition: James Carter (400 m hurdles), Savanté Stringfellow (long jump) Adam Nelson (shot put) and Gail Devers (100 m hurdles).

Results

Men track events

Men field events

  Dwight Phillips's best wind-legal mark in the long jump was 8.14 m (+2.0)
  Tim Rusan's best wind-legal mark in the triple jump was 16.75 m (+0.0)
  LeVar Anderson's best wind-legal mark in the triple jump was 16.65 m (+0.6)

Women track events

Women field events

  Yuliana Perez's best wind-legal mark in the triple jump was 14.10 m (+0.5)
  Teresa Bundy's best wind-legal mark in the triple jump was 13.59 m (+1.3)

Doping
The following athletes had their performances at the competition annulled due to doping:

Tim Montgomery (originally second in the men's 100 m with a time of 9.89 seconds)
Kelli White (originally third place in the women's 100 m with a time of 11.22 seconds)
Ramon Clay (originally winner of the men's 200 m with a time of 20.27 seconds)
Alvin Harrison (originally winner of the men's 400 m with a time of 44.62 seconds)

See also
United States Olympic Trials (track and field)

References

Results
2002 USA Outdoor Track & Field Championships results . USATF. Retrieved on 2015-09-05.
2002 USA Outdoor Combined Events Championships . USATF. Retrieved on 2015-09-05.
Day reports
Gordon, Ed (2002-06-19). O'Brien aborts Decathlon attempt as Pappas takes first-day lead. IAAF. Retrieved on 2015-09-05.
Gordon, Ed (2002-06-20). Burrell, Pappas claim American multi-event titles. IAAF. Retrieved on 2015-09-05.
Gordon, Ed (2002-06-21). Wow! Jones, Greene get US Championships off to a Fast Start. IAAF. Retrieved on 2015-09-05.
Gordon, Ed (2002-06-22). Duels by Greene and Montgomery, Nelson and Godina, Jones and Gaines highlight US championships' second day. IAAF. Retrieved on 2015-09-05.
Gordon, Ed (2002-06-23). Hot hurdling and sprinting at last day of US Champs. IAAF. Retrieved on 2015-09-05.

External links
USA Track & Field official website

USA Outdoor Track and Field Championships
Usa Outdoor Track And Field Championships, 2002
Track and field
Palo Alto, California
Track and field in California
USA Outdoor Track and Field Championships